The Communist University of the Toilers of the East (KUTV) (also known as the Far East University) was a revolutionary training school for important communist political leaders. The school operated under the umbrella of the Communist International and was in existence from 1921 until the late 1930s. Part of the university was split into the Moscow Sun Yat-sen University.

History

The Communist University of the Toilers of the East (KUTV) was established in 1921 in Moscow by the Communist International (Comintern) as a technical college for communist cadres from the Soviet periphery, though it also matriculated students from the Arab world, Africa, and East and South Asia. The school officially opened on 21 October 1921. It performed a similar function to the International Lenin School, which mainly accepted students from Europe and the Americas. It was headed in its initial years by Grigory Broydo, later First Secretary of the Communist Party of Tajikistan. The curriculum included both theoretical and practical matters, including Marxist theory, party organization and propaganda, law and administration, theory and tactics of proletarian revolution, problems of socialist construction, and trade union organization.

From summer 1922, the KUTV had regional branches in Baku (in Azerbaijan), Irkutsk (in Siberia, Russia), and Tashkent (in Uzbekistan). The University published Revolutionary East (Революционный Восток, Revoliutsionnyi Vostok). Amongst those who taught there were Ho Chi Minh, Anatoly Lunacharsky, Leonid Krasin, Mikhail Pokrovsky, Khalid Bakdash, Igor Reisner, and Boris Shumyatsky.

In 1928, the Japanese Foreign Ministry estimated that some 1,000 foreign students studied at KUTV, and that the 400 Chinese students comprised the largest group, followed by 350 ethnic minorities within the Soviet Union, and between 30 and 40 Japanese. The Soviet Union solicited working-class Japanese to study at the KUTV without the Japanese government's consent. The Japanese students studied under Sadaki Takahashi and Keizo Yamamoto, along with several Russian instructors. The Japanese students studied economics, the history of world revolution, Leninism, philosophy, labor union theory, and Japanese studies. Kyuichi Tokuda, a member of the Japanese Communist Party, was instrumental in recruiting and sending these Japanese workers to KUTV via Shanghai and Vladivostok.

The KUTV published a journal entitled Revolutsionnyi vostok (Russian: Revolutionary East) between 1927 and 1938. 

The University was closed in the late 1930s. A report from the University of Virginia notes:

Notable alumni

Prominent alumni of the KUTV include: 

 Khertek Anchimaa-Toka, chairperson of the Little Khural of Tannu-Tuva
 Khalid Bakdash, secretary of the Syrian Communist Party from 1936 until 1995
 Chiang Ching-kuo, President of the Republic of China (Taiwan), 1925 class
 Deng Xiaoping, paramount leader of the People's Republic of China, 1925 class
 Evangelista, Crisanto, founder of the Partido Komunista ng Pilipinas-1930, class of 1928.
 Mirsaid Sultan-Galiev, architect of Muslim national communism
 Hà Huy Tập, third General Secretary of the Communist Party of Vietnam
 Harry Haywood, leading African American member of the Communist Party USA
 Jane Golden, black American student who died during her time at KUTVA 
 Nâzım Hikmet, Turkish poet
 Ho Chi Minh, President of Vietnam, 1923 class
 Hasan Israilov, Chechen insurrectionist
 Sen Katayama of the American and Japanese Communist Parties
 Jomo Kenyatta, first indigenous head of state of Kenya
 Lê Hồng Phong, second General Secretary of the Communist Party of Vietnam
 Liu Shaoqi, President of the People's Republic of China, 1921 class
 Magomet Mamakaev, Chechen writer
 Tan Malaka of the Indonesian Communist Party
 Manabendra Nath Roy, helped found the Communist Parties of Mexico and India
 Muhammad Najati Sidqi, writer, activist in the Palestinian independence movement, from 1925 to 1928
 Ja'far Pishevari, founder and chairman of communist Azerbaijan People's Government
 Salchak Toka, Tuvan government official
 Sbulawelani Shwala, leader of the Young Communist League of South Africa and Revolutionary writer Republic of South Africa
 Trần Phú, first General Secretary of the Communist Party of Vietnam
 Wang Fanxi, prominent Chinese Trotskyist
 Yusuf Salman Yusuf, secretary of the Iraqi Communist Party from 1941 to 1949
 Nikolaos Zachariadis, General Secretary of Communist Party of Greece and chairman of Greek communist Provisional Democratic Government, 1947 to 1949

See also 
 Moscow Sun Yat-sen University
 Communist University of the National Minorities of the West
 List of modern universities in Europe (1801–1945)
 Chinese-Lenin School of Vladivostok
 "Sun Yat-sen University in Moscow and the Chinese Revolution: A Personal Account" by Yueh Sheng

References

Citations

Sources 

  Great Soviet Encyclopedia entry
  "The Political Tasks of the University of the Peoples of the East" speech by Joseph Stalin (Marxists Internet Archive)

Comintern
Universities and institutes established in the Soviet Union
Foreign relations of the Soviet Union
Educational institutions established in 1921
1921 establishments in Russia
Defunct universities and colleges in Russia
Education in the Soviet Union
Universities and colleges in Moscow